The 1999 Canisius Golden Griffins football team represented Canisius College in the 1999 NCAA Division I-AA football season. The Golden Griffins offense scored 133 points while the defense allowed 431 points.

Schedule

References

Canisius
Canisius Golden Griffins football seasons
Canisius Golden Griffins football